Aboubakar Karamoko (born 15 October 1999) is an Ivorian professional footballer who plays as a winger for Riga on loan from Auda.

Club career
In April 2015 whilst playing for the Aspire Academy, Karamoko was named in the team of the tournament whilst competing in a competition in Catalonia. Two years later whilst playing in the same tournament, he was spotted by Málaga and later signed to the club's academy. He spent the next two seasons featuring for the club's B team, Atlético Malagueño, making 25 appearances. In August 2020, he joined Cypriot First Division side Doxa. On 2 October 2020, Karamoko made his professional debut as a substitute in a 3–3 draw with Karmiotissa. On 5 January 2021, he joined Cypriot Second Division side Digenis Morphou on loan until the end of the season.

In March 2023, he joined league rivals Riga on loan for the 2023 season having featured for Auda the previous season.

References

External links

Profile at Cyprus FA

1999 births
Living people
Ivorian footballers
Association football midfielders
Ivorian expatriate footballers
Aspire Academy (Qatar) players
Atlético Malagueño players
Ermis Aradippou FC players
Doxa Katokopias FC players
FK Auda players
Riga FC players
Segunda División B players
Tercera División players
Cypriot First Division players
Latvian Higher League players
Expatriate footballers in Spain
Expatriate footballers in Cyprus
Expatriate footballers in Latvia
Ivorian expatriate sportspeople in Spain
Ivorian expatriate sportspeople in Cyprus
Ivorian expatriate sportspeople in Latvia